Zion Senior High School (aka. ZICO), also referred to as Zion College of West Africa, is a public senior high school located in Anloga in the Volta Region of Ghana. It was established in 1937, as the New Africa University College by Rev. Dr. Ferdinand Kwasi Fiawoo. ZICO is the oldest second cycle institution in the Volta Region.

Ghanaian poet Kofi Awoonor was an alumnus of Zion College. Other alumni of Zion College include renowned lawyer Sam Okudzeto, Akenten Appiah-Menkah, Hans Kofi Boni, Capt. Joel Sowu, Dr. Nyaho Tamakloe and Rita Korankye Ankrah.

References 

High schools in Ghana
Boarding schools in Ghana
Educational institutions established in 1937
Education in Volta Region
1937 establishments in the British Empire